Ardozyga hypocneca is a species of moth in the family Gelechiidae. It was described by Turner in 1919. It is found in Australia, where it has been recorded from Queensland.

The forewings are dark-fuscous closely irrorated (speckled) with whitish, more so towards the margins. The stigmata are obsolete. The hindwings are very pale whitish-ochreous with the apical one-third grey.

References

Ardozyga
Moths described in 1919
Moths of Australia